Since 2006, the England men's national volleyball team has played as part of the Great Britain men's national volleyball team.

References
http://www.volleyballengland.org
https://web.archive.org/web/20090320153904/http://britishvolleyball.org/
Men's national volleyball team photos''' 

National men's volleyball teams
Volleyball
National
National